A journalist is a person who practises journalism, the gathering and dissemination of information about current events, trends, issues and people.

Journalist may also refer to:
Journalist (British magazine), monthly magazine published by the UK's National Union of Journalists
Journalist (Russian magazine), Russian magazine founded in 1914
Journalist (rapper)
Journalist (1979 film), a Yugoslav film
Journalist (1993 film), an Indian Malayalam film
The Journalist, the narrator of Jeff Wayne's Musical Version of The War of the Worlds

See also
The Journalist (disambiguation)
JournoList
Journal (disambiguation)